Michael Parker is an Australian educationalist who has been the Deputy Headmaster of Cranbrook School, Principal of  Oxley College and is currently the 19th Headmaster of the Sydney GPS school Newington College. He is an enthusiastic proponent of a liberal education. He has been vocal in the current debate in Australia on radically improving education on consent, gender relations and respect. His public profile has risen as he supported his students decision to publicly protest about issues relating to climate change in Australia.

Family and education
Born in Sydney, Parker grew up in the north-western suburbs of North Rocks. He has two younger brothers. His father was English-born and designed electrical engineering equipment and his mother is Maltese-born. She was a paymaster for a local company when he was growing up. Educated locally, Parker attended the academically selective James Ruse Agricultural High School in his teenage years. He is an arts and law graduate of the University of Sydney. Upon graduation Parker commenced his career as a high school teacher. Parker has a Masters Degree in teaching philosophy to children. His wife, Fiona Morrison, is an associate professor in literary studies at UNSW and they have two teenage daughters.

Career
 English Teacher and Housemaster – Cranbrook School
 Teacher – Eton College
 Head of English – Newington College 2002 to 2007
 Deputy Headmaster at Cranbrook 2008 to 2014
 Principal - Oxley College 2014 to 2018
 Headmaster – Newington College since 1 January 2019

Publications
 Talk with your kids : ethics : conversations about honesty, bullying, difference, acceptance and 105 other things that really matter
 Talk with your kids : big ideas : conversations about democracy, infinity, environment, war and punishment, humanity and 77 other big ideas
 Masters in pieces  : the English Canon for the twenty-first century / Michael Parker and co-written by Fiona Morrison
 His young adult novel Doppelganger was shortlisted for the New South Wales Premier's Literary Awards in 2007
 His teen novel  Laverick High Inc was published by Longmans in 1993
 He also co wrote a children’s picture book  You are A Star which was published in the United States of America, Brazil, Korea and China
 His Ethics Book : is being republished in October 2021 including new material and a new title Talk with Your Kids about Things that Matter.

Documentary
A documentary Inspiring Teachers, which followed Parker’s teaching during 2007, was screened on SBS Television in 2008 and 2009.

Trekking
Parker is widely travelled, particularly in Nepal, having undertaken four major treks including past Camp One at 20,000 feet on Mount Everest.

References

Staff of Newington College
Year of birth missing (living people)
Living people
University of Sydney alumni
People educated at James Ruse Agricultural High School
Australian headmasters